"Gentile" is a word with several meanings; in contemporary usage, it usually means "someone who is not a Jew".

Gentile may also refer to:

People
 Gentile (surname), an Italian surname
 Gentile (bishop of Agrigento) (died 1171)

Places
 Gentile Valley, a valley in Idaho
 Appiano Gentile, a comune of the Province of Como, Italy
 Olmo Gentile, a comune of the Province of Asti, Italy

Other uses
 Anatolidion gentile, a species of comb-footed spider
 Riforma Gentile, an Italian educational reform of 1923
 Sangiovese or Prugnolo Gentile, a red wine grape variety

See also
Gentle (disambiguation)